Novy Sharoy (Kerla-Şara) is a rural locality (a selo) in Achkhoy-Martanovsky District, Chechnya.

Administrative and municipal status 
Municipally, Novy Sharoy is incorporated as Novo-Sharoyskoye rural settlement. It is the administrative center of the municipality and is the only settlement included in it.

Geography 

Novy Sharoy is located on the left bank of the Assa River. The village is on the south-western outskirts of the Samashki Forest.

The nearest settlements to Novy Shary are Shaami-Yurt in the south-east, Achkhoy-Martan in the south, Assinovskaya in the south-west, Sernovodskoye in the north-west, Davydenko and Samashki in the north.

History 
In 1957, after the Vaynakh people returned from the genocide and deportation of 1944 and the Chechen-Ingush ASSR was restored, the residents of Sharoysky District were forbidden to resettle in their ancestral homes until many years later. As a result, in 1964, Novy Sharoy was founded for former residents of the village of Sharoy who could not return.

Population 
 1990 Census: 1,425
 2002 Census: 1,739
 2010 Census: 1,924
 2019 estimate: 2,203
 2023 Census: 20,678

According to the results of the 2010 Census, the majority of residents of Novy Sharoy were ethnic Chechens.

Education 
The village hosts one secondary school, the Novosharoyevsky Municipal Secondary School.

References 

Rural localities in Achkhoy-Martanovsky District